Oak Orchard is an unincorporated community east of the town of Millsboro in Sussex County, Delaware, United States.  Oak Orchard is bordered to the south by the Indian River Bay, to the east by Emily Gut (a narrow channel of water) and "the Peninsula", and to the north by Delaware Route 24. 

Oak Orchard is part of the Salisbury, Maryland-Delaware Metropolitan Statistical Area.

This area has been the home of the Nanticoke Indian Tribe for over 2000 years and is home to the Nanticoke Indian Museum as well as a yearly Pow-wow held by the tribe. The unincorporated community is home to the Oak Orchard/Riverdale Post of the American Legion.

Fire protection is provided by the Indian River Vol. Fire Co., ambulance service by the Mid-Sussex Rescue Squad, and police services are provided by the Delaware State Police as there is no incorporated town to provide such services. Oak Orchard was the scene of a house fire on January 3, 2001, that killed 11 family members.

References

Unincorporated communities in Sussex County, Delaware
Unincorporated communities in Delaware
Nanticoke tribe